is a passenger railway station  located in the city of Odawara, Kanagawa Prefecture, Japan, operated by the Izuhakone Railway.

Lines
Isaida Station is served by the  Daiyūzan Line, and is located 1.4 kilometers from the line’s terminus at Odawara Station.

Station layout
The station consists of a single side platform connected by stairs to a concrete one-story station building. The station building served as an office for the real estate company owned by the Izuhakone Railway until it was closed in 2006. The station is now unmanned.

Adjacent stations

History
Isaida Station was opened on November 24, 1923, with the official opening of the Izuhakone Railway's Daiyūzan Line.

Passenger statistics
In fiscal 2019, the station was used by an average of 1,745 passengers daily (boarding passengers only).

The passenger figures (boarding passengers only) for previous years are as shown below.

Surrounding area
 Ashigara Station 
Fujifilm Kanagawa Factory Odawara Site
Ogicho Post Office
Odawara College of Nursing

See also
List of railway stations in Japan

References

External links

Izuhakone Railway home page 

Railway stations in Kanagawa Prefecture
Railway stations in Japan opened in 1923
Izuhakone Daiyuzan Line
Railway stations in Odawara